Harsha Chemudu (born 31 August 1990), popularly known as "Viva" Harsha, is an Indian actor and comedian who works in Telugu films. He started his acting career with the viral web series "Viva" on YouTube with which he came to be known as "Viva" Harsha. He pursued his Engineering in Visakhapatnam, Andhra Pradesh, India.

Early life 
He was born and brought up in a middle-class family in Vishakhapatnam, Andhra Pradesh, India. He completed his early schooling from Vingam Vidyalayam School in his hometown and his degree in Bachelor of Technology in Mechanical Engineering from Chaitanya Engineering College in Bhimavaram, Andhra Pradesh, India. 

Since childhood, he was inclined towards acting and filming and always wanted to be a successful actor in the Telugu film industry. His father, Satyanarayana Rao, is a bank manager at Federal Bank. His mother, Rama Devi, is a homemaker. He was an introvert till he started acting in short films and joined the Telugu film industry.

Career 
Viva Harsha started his career in the Telugu film industry with his debut appearance in a short film titled “Viva” in 2013, directed by his best friend, Sabarish Kandregula which premiered on YouTube. His appearance in this short film gained him popularity and fan following and he also got recognition in the Telugu industry as Viva Harsha. After that, he made his debut on the big-screen with his appearance in the Telugu movie Masala in 2013. He also worked in films like Govindudu Andarivadele, Dohchay, Colour Photo, Thank You Brother, Thimmarusu: Assignment Vali & others. With his hard work and impressive acting skills, he established himself as a well-known comedian in the Telugu film industry.

Web-series 
He worked in the web series The Grill (2019) and Hostel Daze (2019). He also co-hosted Sam Jam with Samantha Ruth Prabhu in 2020 and the host of Tamasha with Harsha, both streamed on Aha.

Filmography

Films

Television

YouTube videos

References

External links

Living people
Indian male film actors
1990 births
Indian male comedians
Indian YouTubers
Telugu comedians
Male actors in Telugu cinema
Male actors from Visakhapatnam

Indian television talk show hosts